The Corinthian is a 57-story apartment building that was New York City's largest apartment building when it opened in 1988.

Background
The building is located on the former site of the East Side Airline Terminal, a passenger terminal that provided bus service to LaGuardia and JFK airports via the adjacent Queens–Midtown Tunnel. The terminal closed in 1984 and was auctioned off by the Metropolitan Transportation Authority the following year. Initially expected to sell for $50 million, a bidding war drove up the price of the real estate to $90.6 million; the site was attractive to developers as it was already zoned to permit high-density use and there would be no occupants to relocate after the terminal's remaining leases expired in 1986. The winning bidder was a joint venture consisting of Bernard Spitzer, Peter L. Malkin, and two privately held corporations—International Energy Corporation and Kriti Exploration Inc.

Design
The development team had originally planned to tear down the entire East Side Airline Terminal, but after discovering that it was very well constructed they decided to save a significant portion of the terminal and incorporate it as offices in the base of the structure, adding columns to support the new residential tower above. The remaining 35 percent of the terminal along First Avenue was demolished to create a landscaped plaza, fountain, and porte-cochère. 

The Corinthian was designed by Der Scutt, design architect, and John Schimenti. Its fluted towers with bay windows are unusual compared to the traditional boxy shape of buildings in the city, and it bears a resemblance to Marina City and Lake Point Tower in Chicago. According to Bernard Spitzer, the building was named the Corinthian because "we think we have the contemporary version of the Corinthian column, the most lavish of the Greek columns." The semicircular windows provide a 180-degree view from every apartment. Many of the apartments include private balconies, which are located between the fluted towers.

At  it is the largest project of Bernard Spitzer. It occupies a full city block between First Avenue and Tunnel Entrance Street and between East 37th and 38th Streets, and overlooks the Manhattan entrance to the Queens–Midtown Tunnel and St. Vartan Park. It has 863 apartments,  of commercial space on the first through third floors, a  garage and setback roof deck.

History
The Spitzer family sold off the building's parking garage in 2009 for $10.3 million and the office condominiums in 2011 for $31 million. The office units were later renovated to attract more high-end medical practices given its proximity to NYU Langone Medical Center.

In 2013, Gaia Real Estate purchased the 50th floor of the building for $14.6 million from Pfizer, which had bought the floor before the building opened and used the  layout consisting of 21 bedrooms and 25 bathrooms as a corporate executive suite for its nearby headquarters at Second Avenue and 42nd Street. The 50th floor was subsequently renovated and divided into separate apartments. A year later, Gaia bought 144 more units in The Corinthian for $147 million, which were originally owned by the Spitzer family and had been rented out. These apartments were remarketed as The Corinthian Collection and sold in their original layout or as renovated units designed by Andres Escobar.

References
Notes

External links

Cityrealty.com profile
NYC-architecture.com profile
Emporis profile

Residential buildings completed in 1988
Apartment buildings in New York City
Residential skyscrapers in Manhattan
Murray Hill, Manhattan
1988 establishments in New York City